Marie-France Beaufils (born 22 November 1946) is a member of the Senate of France, representing the Indre-et-Loire department.  She is a member of the Communist, Republican, and Citizen Group.

References
Page on the Senate website

1946 births
Living people
French Senators of the Fifth Republic
Women members of the Senate (France)
21st-century French women politicians
Senators of Indre-et-Loire